Jiang Yonghua (born September 7, 1973 in Jixi, Heilongjiang) is a female Chinese track cyclist. She is a former world record holder for the Women's 500 m Time Trial, which was set on August 11, 2002 in Kunming with a time of 34.000 seconds. On 20 August 2004, she also broke the Olympic record at the 2004 Summer Olympics in Athens, setting a time of 34.112 seconds, but was beaten by Australia's Anna Meares a few minutes later, with new Olympic and world record time of 33.952 seconds.

Yonghua began cycling career with the Heilongjiang Provincial Sports Team C in October 1989. She became a member of the Beijing team in December 1999.

Palmarès

2001
1st  500 m Time Trial, Chinese National Championships

2002
1st 500 m Time Trial, round of UCI Track Cycling World Cup Classics
1st 500 m Time Trial, Asian Games

2003
1st  500 m Time Trial, Chinese National Championships
5th 500 m Time Trial, 2003 UCI Track Cycling World Championships

2004
2nd 500 m Time Trial, 2004 UCI Track Cycling World Championships
2nd 500 m Time Trial, 2004 Summer Olympics

References

1973 births
Living people
Chinese female cyclists
Cyclists at the 2004 Summer Olympics
Olympic cyclists of China
Olympic silver medalists for China
People from Jixi
Olympic medalists in cycling
Cyclists from Heilongjiang
Asian Games medalists in cycling
Cyclists at the 2002 Asian Games
Medalists at the 2004 Summer Olympics
Medalists at the 2002 Asian Games
Asian Games gold medalists for China
21st-century Chinese women